Christian Cappelen (26 January 1845 – 11 May 1916) was a Norwegian organist and composer.

Biography 
Cappelen was born in Drammen, Norway. He studied under Ludvig Mathias Lindeman and at the Leipzig Conservatoire. In 1887, after 20 years as organist in Drammen (Strømsø and Bragernes), he became organist at Vår Frelsers kirke, the Cathedral in Kristiania, a position he held until his death in 1916. He gained a prominent position of the Norwegian Church music. He was also teacher in the Fair song at the Practical-Theological Seminary at the University of Oslo (1890-1916). Cappelen was known as a highly skilled organ player and improviser, and he gave concerts all over Norway. As a composer he is within the romantic era, and was influenced from Mendelssohn and Schumann. He published some songs, piano pieces, organ works, cantatas, and more. Especially known is his melody to the hymn "Min lodd falt mig liflig", which was part of the kantate to 25 year anniversary of Diakonissehjemmet in 1894. In the Norwegian hymn book (1986), it was called "Min Herre har kalt meg". This hymn is missing from the Norwegian hymn book of 2013, but the melody is passed on to the hymn "Mer hellighet gi meg". Cappelen also prepared for the Messebog for den norske Kirke (1891).

References

External links
 

1845 births
1916 deaths
19th-century classical composers
19th-century Norwegian composers
19th-century conductors (music)
20th-century classical composers
20th-century Norwegian composers
20th-century conductors (music)
20th-century Norwegian male musicians
Male conductors (music)
Norwegian classical composers
Norwegian conductors (music)
Norwegian male classical composers
Norwegian Romantic composers
Musicians from Drammen
Place of death missing